George Bradbury (1770–1823) was a US Representative from Massachusetts.

George Bradbury may also refer to:

George Bradbury (judge) (died 1696), English judge
George Henry Bradbury (1859–1925), Canadian politician